Operation Smiling Buddha or Operation Happy Krishna (MEA designation: Pokhran-I) was the assigned code name of India's first successful nuclear bomb test on 18 May 1974. The bomb was detonated on the army base Pokhran Test Range (PTR), in Rajasthan, by the Indian Army under the supervision of several key Indian generals.

Pokhran-I was also the first confirmed nuclear weapons test by a nation outside the five permanent members of the United Nations Security Council. Officially, the Indian Ministry of External Affairs (MEA) characterised this test as a "peaceful nuclear explosion". Indira Gandhi, then the Prime Minister of India, saw a massive rise in popularity following this test. After this, a series of nuclear tests were carried out in 1998 under the name Pokhran-II.

History

Early origins, 1944 – 1960s  

India started its own nuclear programme in 1944 when Homi Jehangir Bhabha founded the Tata Institute of Fundamental Research. Physicist Raja Ramanna played an essential role in nuclear weapons technology research; he expanded and supervised scientific research on nuclear weapons and was the first directing officer of the small team of scientists that supervised and carried out the test.

After Indian independence from the British Empire, Indian Prime Minister Jawaharlal Nehru authorised the development of a nuclear programme headed by Homi Bhabha. The Atomic Energy Act of 1948 focused on peaceful development. India was heavily involved in the development of the Nuclear Non-Proliferation Treaty, but ultimately opted not to sign it.

In 1954, Homi Jehangir Bhabha steered the nuclear programme in the direction of weapons design and production. Two important infrastructure projects were commissioned. The first project established Trombay Atomic Energy Establishment at Mumbai. The other one created a governmental secretariat, Department of Atomic Energy (DAE), of which Bhabha was the first secretary. From 1954 to 1959, the nuclear programme grew swiftly. By 1958, the DAE had one-third of the defence budget for research purposes. In 1954, India reached a verbal understanding with Canada and the United States under the Atoms for Peace programme; Canada and the United States ultimately agreed to provide and establish the CIRUS research reactor also at Trombay. The acquisition of CIRUS was a watershed event in nuclear proliferation with the understanding between India and the United States that the reactor would be used for peaceful purposes only. CIRUS was an ideal facility to develop a plutonium device, and therefore Nehru refused to accept nuclear fuel from Canada and started the programme to develop an indigenous nuclear fuel cycle.

In July 1958, Nehru authorised "Project Phoenix" to build a reprocessing plant with a capacity of 20 tons of fuel a year – a size to match the production capacity of CIRUS. The plant used the PUREX process and was designed by the Vitro Corporation of America. Construction of the plutonium plant began at Trombay on 27 March 1961, and it was commissioned in mid-1964.

The nuclear programme continued to mature, and by 1960, Nehru made the critical decision to move the programme into production. At about the same time, Nehru held discussions with the American firm Westinghouse Electric to construct India's first nuclear power plant in Tarapur, Maharashtra. Kenneth Nichols, a US Army engineer, recalls from a meeting with Nehru, "it was that time when Nehru turned to Bhabha and asked Bhabha for the timeline of the development of a nuclear weapon". Bhabha estimated he would need about a year to accomplish the task.

By 1962, the nuclear programme was still developing, but things had slowed down. Nehru was distracted by the Sino-Indian War, during which India lost territory to China. Nehru turned to the Soviet Union for help, but the Soviet Union was preoccupied with the Cuban Missile Crisis. The Soviet Politburo turned down Nehru's request for arms and continued backing the Chinese. India concluded that the Soviet Union was an unreliable ally, and this conclusion strengthened India's determination to create a nuclear deterrent. Design work began in 1965 under Bhabha and proceeded under Raja Ramanna who took over the programme after Bhabha's death.

Weapons development, 1960–1972

Bhabha was now aggressively lobbying for nuclear weapons and made several speeches on Indian radio.  In 1964, Bhabha told the Indian public via radio that "such nuclear weapons are remarkably cheap" and supported his arguments by referring to the economic cost of the American nuclear testing programme Project Plowshare. Bhabha stated to the politicians that a 10 kt device would cost around $350,000, and $600,000 for a 2 mt. From this, he estimated that "a stockpile" of around 50 atomic bombs would cost under $21 million and a stockpile of 50 two-megaton hydrogen bombs would cost around $31.5 million." Bhabha did not realise, however, that the U.S. Plowshare cost-figures were produced by a vast industrial complex costing tens of billions of dollars, which had already manufactured nuclear weapons numbering in the tens of thousands. The delivery systems for nuclear weapons typically cost several times as much as the weapons themselves.

The nuclear programme was partially slowed when Lal Bahadur Shastri became the prime minister. Shastri faced the Indo-Pakistani War of 1965. He appointed physicist Vikram Sarabhai as the head of the nuclear programme but, because of his non-violent Gandhian beliefs, Sarabhai directed it toward peaceful purposes rather than military development.

In 1967, Indira Gandhi became the prime minister and work on the nuclear programme resumed with renewed vigour.  Homi Sethna, a chemical engineer, played a significant role in the development of weapon-grade plutonium, while Ramanna designed and manufactured the entire nuclear device. India's first nuclear bomb project did not employ more than 75 scientists because of its sensitivity. The weapons programme was now directed towards the production of plutonium rather than uranium.

In 1968–69, P. K. Iyengar visited the Soviet Union with three colleagues and toured the nuclear research facilities at Dubna, Russia. During his visit, Iyengar was impressed by the plutonium-fueled pulsed fast reactor. Upon his return to India, Iyengar set about developing plutonium reactors approved by the Indian political leadership in January 1969. The secret plutonium plant was known as Purnima, and construction began in March 1969. The plant's leadership included Iyengar, Ramanna, Homi Sethna, and Sarabhai. Sarabhai's presence indicates that, with or without formal approval, the work on nuclear weapons at Trombay had already commenced.

Secrecy and test preparations, 1972–1974

In December 1971, during the Indo-Pakistani War, the U.S. government sent a carrier battle group led by the  into the Bay of Bengal in an attempt to intimidate India. The Soviet Union responded by sending a submarine armed with nuclear missiles from Vladivostok to trail the US task force. The Soviet response demonstrated the deterrent value and significance of nuclear weapons and ballistic missile submarines to Indira Gandhi. India gained the military and political initiative over Pakistan after acceding to the treaty that divided Pakistan and led to the creation of Bangladesh.

On 7 September 1972, near the peak of her post-war popularity, Indira Gandhi authorised the Bhabha Atomic Research Centre (BARC) to manufacture a nuclear device and prepare it for a test.  Although the Indian Army was not fully involved in the nuclear testing, the army's highest command was kept fully informed of the test preparations. The preparations were carried out under the watchful eyes of the Indian political leadership, with civilian scientists assisting the Indian Army.

The device was formally called the "Peaceful Nuclear Explosive", but it was usually referred to as the Smiling Buddha. The device was detonated on 18 May 1974, Buddha Jayanti (a festival day in India marking the birth of Gautama Buddha).  Indira Gandhi maintained tight control of all aspects of the preparations of the Smiling Buddha test, which was conducted in extreme secrecy; besides Gandhi, only advisers Parmeshwar Haksar and Durga Dhar were kept informed. Scholar Raj Chengappa asserts the Indian Defence Minister Jagjivan Ram was not provided with any knowledge of this test and came to learn of it only after it was conducted.  Swaran Singh, the Minister of External Affairs, was given only a 48 hours advance notice. The Indira Gandhi administration employed no more than 75 civilian scientists, while General G. G. Bewoor, Indian army chief, and the commander of Indian Western Command were the only military commanders kept informed.

Development teams and sites

The head of this entire nuclear bomb project was the director of the BARC, Raja Ramanna. In later years, his role in the nuclear programme would be more deeply integrated as he remained head of the nuclear programme most of his life. The designer and creator of the bomb was P. K. Iyengar, who was the second in command of this project. Iyengar's work was further assisted by the chief metallurgist, R. Chidambaram, and by Nagapattinam Sambasiva Venkatesan of the Terminal Ballistics Research Laboratory, who developed and manufactured the high explosive implosion system. The explosive materials and the detonation system were developed by Waman Dattatreya Patwardhan of the High Energy Materials Research Laboratory.

The overall project was supervised by chemical engineer Homi Sethna, Chairman of the Atomic Energy Commission of India. Chidambaram, who would later coordinate work on the Pokhran-II tests, began work on the equation of state of plutonium in late 1967 or early 1968. To preserve secrecy, the project employed no more than 75 scientists and engineers from 1967 to 1974.  Abdul Kalam also arrived at the test site as the representative of the DRDO.

A. K. Ganguly, of the BARC, was the "Test" project chief of health and safety, as well as, chief of post "Test" scientific investigations programme. As early as 1956, Ganguly was selected by Homi J. Bhabha, from his academic perch, at the University of Notre Dame, USA, where he had originated the Ganguly-Magee theory in Radiation Chemistry. During Ganguly's career in the BARC, Vikram A. Sarabhai selected him to lead the process of formation of the Ministry of Environment.

The device was of the implosion-type design and had a close resemblance to Fat Man, the American nuclear bomb detonated over Nagasaki in 1945. The implosion system was assembled at the Terminal Ballistics Research Laboratory (TBRL) of the DRDO in Chandigarh. The detonation system was developed at the High Energy Materials Research Laboratory (HEMRL) of the DRDO in Pune, Maharashtra State.  The 6 kg of plutonium came from the CIRUS reactor at BARC. The neutron initiator was of the polonium–beryllium type and code-named Flower. V.K. Iya of BARC was on the team which developed the neutron initiator. The entire nuclear bomb was engineered and finally assembled by Indian engineers at Trombay before transportation to the test site.

Nuclear weapon design

Cross-section

The fully assembled device had a hexagonal cross section, 1.25 metres in diameter, and weighed 1400 kg. The device was mounted on a hexagonal metal tripod, and was transported to the shaft on rails which the army kept covered with sand. The device was detonated when Pranab R. Dastidar pushed the firing button at 8.05 a.m.; it was in a shaft 107 m under the army Pokhran test range in the Thar Desert, Rajasthan.

Controversy regarding the yield

The nuclear yield of this test still remains controversial, with unclear data provided by Indian sources, although Indian politicians have given the country's press a range from 2 kt to 20 kt. The official yield was initially set at 12 kt; post-Operation Shakti claims have raised it to 13 kt. Independent seismic data from outside and analysis of the crater features indicate a lower figure. Analysts usually estimate the yield at 4 to 6 kt, using conventional seismic magnitude-to-yield conversion formulas. In recent years, both Homi Sethna and P. K. Iyengar have conceded the official yield to be an exaggeration.

Iyengar has variously stated that the yield was 8–10 kt, that the device was designed to yield 10 kt, and that the yield was 8 kt "exactly as predicted". Although seismic scaling laws lead to an estimated yield range between 3.2 kt and 21 kt, an analysis of hard rock cratering effects suggests a narrow range of around 8 kt for the yield, which is within the uncertainties of the seismic yield estimate.

Aftermath

Domestic reaction

Indian Prime Minister Indira Gandhi had already gained much popularity after her successful military campaign against Pakistan in the 1971 war.  The test caused an immediate revival of Indira Gandhi's popularity, which had flagged considerably from its heights after the 1971 war. The overall popularity and image of the Congress Party was enhanced and the Congress Party was well received in the Indian Parliament. In 1975, Homi Sethna, a chemical engineer and the chairman of the Indian Atomic Energy Commission (AECI), Raja Ramanna of BARC, and Basanti Nagchaudhuri of DRDO, all were honoured with the Padma Vibhushan, India's second highest civilian award. Five other project members received the Padma Shri, India's fourth highest civilian award. India consistently maintained that this was a peaceful nuclear bomb test and that it had no intentions of militarising its nuclear programme. However, according to independent monitors, this test was part of an accelerated Indian nuclear programme.
In 1997 Raja Ramanna, speaking to the Press Trust of India, maintained:

International reaction

While India continued to state that the test was for peaceful purposes, it encountered opposition from many quarters. The Nuclear Suppliers Group (NSG) was formed in reaction to the Indian tests to check international nuclear proliferation. The NSG decided in 1992 to require full-scope IAEA safeguards for any new nuclear export deals, which effectively ruled out nuclear exports to India, but in 2008 it waived this restriction on nuclear trade with India as part of the Indo-US civilian nuclear agreement.

Pakistan

Pakistan did not view the test as a "peaceful nuclear explosion", and cancelled talks scheduled for 10 June on normalisation of relations. Pakistan's Prime Minister Zulfikar Ali Bhutto vowed in June 1974 that he would never succumb to "nuclear blackmail" or accept "Indian hegemony or domination over the subcontinent". The chairman of the Pakistan Atomic Energy Commission, Munir Ahmed Khan, said that the test would force Pakistan to test its own nuclear bomb. Pakistan's leading nuclear physicist, Pervez Hoodbhoy, stated in 2011 that he believed the test "pushed [Pakistan] further into the nuclear arena".

Canada and United States

The plutonium used in the test was created in the CIRUS reactor supplied by Canada and using heavy water supplied by the United States. Both countries reacted negatively, especially in light of then ongoing negotiations on the Nuclear Non-Proliferation Treaty and the economic aid both countries had provided to India. Canada concluded that the test violated a 1971 understanding between the two states, and froze nuclear energy assistance for the two heavy water reactors then under construction. The United States concluded that the test did not violate any agreement and proceeded with a June 1974 shipment of enriched uranium for the Tarapur reactor.

Subsequent nuclear explosions

Despite many proposals, India did not carry out further nuclear tests until 1998. After the 1998 general elections, Operation Shakti (also known as Pokhran-II) was carried out at the Pokhran test site, using technology designed and built over the preceding two decades.

See also

 India and weapons of mass destruction
 History of nuclear weapons
 List of countries with nuclear weapons
 Pokhran-II

Notes

References

External links 

Explosions in 1974
1974 in India
1974 in military history
Indian nuclear weapons testing
Political history of India
Underground nuclear weapons testing
Indira Gandhi administration
Code names
Pokaran
Nuclear history of India
Nuclear proliferation
Military history of India
Politics of India
A. P. J. Abdul Kalam
May 1974 events in Asia
History of the Indian Army